Senator Horry may refer to:

Daniel Horry (died 1785), South Carolina State Senate
Peter Horry (1743–1815), South Carolina State Senate